Jäglitz is a river of Brandenburg and Saxony-Anhalt, Germany. It flows into the Havel near Vehlgast. A branch called Alte Jäglitz flows into the Dosse near Rübehorst.

See also
List of rivers of Brandenburg
List of rivers of Saxony-Anhalt

Rivers of Brandenburg
Rivers of Saxony-Anhalt
Rivers of Germany